Charles-Philippe Beaubien (May 10, 1870 – January 17, 1949) was a lawyer and political figure in Quebec. He sat for Montarville division in the Senate of Canada from 1915 to 1949.

He was born in Outremont, the son of Louis Beaubien and Suzanne Lauretta Stuart. Beaubien was educated at the Collège Sainte-Marie and the Université Laval. He was admitted to the Quebec bar in 1894. In 1899, he married Margaret Rosemary Power. He was director for several companies including Atlantic Sugar Refineries, Dominion Steel Corporation et Canada Fire Insurance. Beaubien died in office at the age of 78.

After his death in 1949, he was entombed at the Notre Dame des Neiges Cemetery in Montreal. His son Louis-Philippe Beaubien also served in the Canadian senate.

References 

Beaubien-Casgrain family
Canadian senators from Quebec
Conservative Party of Canada (1867–1942) senators
1870 births
1949 deaths
Burials at Notre Dame des Neiges Cemetery